Maximiliano Javier Araújo Vilches (born 15 February 2000) is a Uruguayan professional footballer who plays as a left-back and left-winger for Liga MX club Toluca.

Club career
At the end of December 2019 it was confirmed, Araújo had signed a deal until the end of 2023 with Liga MX club Puebla.

International career
On 21 October 2022, Araújo was named in Uruguay's 55-man preliminary squad for the 2022 FIFA World Cup.

References

External links

2000 births
Living people
Uruguayan footballers
Uruguayan expatriate footballers
Uruguayan Primera División players
Liga MX players
Montevideo Wanderers F.C. players
Club Puebla players
Association football defenders
Association football wingers
Uruguayan expatriate sportspeople in Mexico
Expatriate footballers in Mexico
Uruguay under-20 international footballers